Galerucella is a genus of leaf beetles in the family Chrysomelidae described by George Robert Crotch in 1873. It is widely distributed but absent in the Neotropics. Some species feed on waterlilies and are used as biocontrol of introduced, invasive waterlilies. Galerucella tenella feed on strawberry plants.

Adults are 3.5-4.2 mm long, yellowish brown, metathorax and abdomen black; elytra evenly convex. The eggs measure 0.5-0.6 mm, globose, reddish yellow. Larvae 5–6 mm long, yellowish brown with rows of dark transverse bands and warts with setae; legs and head are black. Pupae 3.5–4 mm, black.

The immature beetles hibernate under plant remains. In the spring, in the second half of April, at a temperature of 13-14 °C, the beetles leave the wintering grounds and in addition feed: they skeletonize the leaves and gnaw through the sinuous holes. Less often damage the petioles of leaves, inflorescences and flowers. During the extension of the buds, the females lay 1 or 2 eggs each day in the gnawed holes on the underside of the leaves. The period of egg laying is stretched, up to 30 to 45 days. Fertility - 150-200 eggs. Embryonic development lasts from 12 to 20 days. Larvae live 25 to 30 days, skeletonize the leaves. After completing its development, they pass to the surface layer of the soil near the plants and pupate. Beetles that come out after 8 to 12 days, eat leaves for a while, after which they pass to wintering. One generation per year develops.

Species

Galerucella contains the following species, divided into two subgenera Galerucella and Neogalerucella (the latter of which is sometimes considered a separate genus):

Subgenus Galerucella Crotch, 1873

 Galerucella aludela 
 Galerucella amboinensis 
 Galerucella angulosa 
 Galerucella aquatica 
 Galerucella aurata 
 Galerucella bataviensis 
 Galerucella birmanica 
 Galerucella chujoi 
 Galerucella consentanea 
 Galerucella grisescens 
 Galerucella nipponensis 
 Galerucella nymphaeae  – waterlily leaf beetle 
 Galerucella ohkurai 
 Galerucella ozeana 
 Galerucella picea  - (Ypresian, Allenby Formation, Canada)
 Galerucella placida 
 Galerucella sagittariae 

Subgenus Neogalerucella Chûjô, 1962:

 Galerucella anserina 
 Galerucella calmariensis  – loosestrife leaf beetle
 Galerucella fossata 
 Galerucella lineola 
 Galerucella medvedevi 
 Galerucella pusilla  – golden loosestrife beetle
 Galerucella quebecensis 
 Galerucella semenowi 
 Galerucella stefanssoni 
 Galerucella tenella  – strawberry leaf beetle

References

BioLib
Fauna Europaea
Biol.uni

Galerucinae
Chrysomelidae genera
Taxa named by George Robert Crotch